Hermes is a machine-to-machine communication standard used in the SMT assembly industry.

It is a successor to the SMEMA standard, introducing improvements such as: simpler physical wiring (Ethernet), use of popular data transmission formats (TCP/IP and XML), reduced number of barcode scanners (required only once at the beginning of the line), transmission of board data (such as barcodes & dimensions) to downstream machines.

By the end of 2018 IPC has confirmed to recognize The Hermes Standard to be the successor to “the SMEMA Standard” IPC-SMEMA-9851, which has been the only globally accepted and broadly established standard for machine to machine communication in SMT with regards to PCB handover. Accordingly, The Hermes Standard was assigned an IPC naming code: It can now officially be referred to as IPC-HERMES-9852.

The actual version, IPC-HERMES-9852, version 1.5 version 1.2 provides an electrical SMEMA interface replacement and extends the interface to communicate such things as unique identifiers for handled printed boards, equipment identifiers of the first machine noticing a printed board, barcodes, conveyor speed and specific information about the product type.

Industry acceptance
The initiative was started by two companies: ASM and ASYS; by April 2017, 17 companies had joined. On November 14, 2017, Hermes received a Global SMT&Packaging Award in the category “Software Process Control” at Productronica in Munich, Germany. As of November 2021, 62 companies are members of the initiative.

Specification
 Munich, April 2017 release of Version 1.0
 Munich, November 2017 release of Version 1.0 Revision 1
 Shanghai, April 2018 release of Version 1.1
 San Diego, January 2019 release of Version 1.2
 Online, March 2021 release of Version 1.3
 Munich and Online, November 2021 release of Version 1.4
 Online, June 2022, release of version 1.5

The specification is freely available for download from the project website. At the same time, the standard is available in the IPC Online Shop.

References

Links 

 a lightweight open source implementation of the Hermes protocol: http://smartfactory.openapc.com

Machine to machine